Sharni Webb (born 14 July 1991) is an Australian rules footballer playing for the Brisbane Lions in the AFL Women's.

Early life
Following encouragement from her brothers, Webb started out playing Australian rules football at the age of 15 in the Caloundra Women's League. After the league folded, she joined Zillmere Eagles in Brisbane. Webb played as a key position forward for the University of Queensland. From 2014, she acted as an assistant coach, as well as a player, due to her qualification as a physical education teacher. Even after being drafted to Brisbane, she continued playing for University of Queensland during the off-season, helping them reach the preliminary finals in 2018.

AFLW career
Webb was recruited by Brisbane for the AFL Women's (AFLW) with pick number 111 in the 2016 AFL Women's draft. She made her debut in Brisbane's inaugural game against Melbourne at Casey Fields on 5 February 2017. Brisbane signed Webb for the 2018 season during the trade period in May 2017. For the 2018 season, she was elevated to the club's leadership group. In May 2018, Brisbane re-signed Webb for the 2019 season. During the season, she had a stress fracture and missed three games of the season. In April 2019, Webb was re-signed by Brisbane for the 2020 season. Following two years as part of the leadership group, she was named vice-captain for the season, under captain Emma Zielke. Webb reached the milestone of 25 AFLW games in the fifth round of the season. After missing the 2021 AFL Women's season due to pregnancy, Webb signed a one-year contract with the club, keeping her with  until the end of the 2022 season.

Personal life
Webb was born in Nambour, Queensland. Besides playing football, Webb works full-time as a school teacher, teaching physical education. During the COVID-19 pandemic in Australia worked in online teaching with Ambrose Treacy College. In early 2018, Webb married her longtime partner, Andrew Maclean.

References

External links

1991 births
Living people
Sportswomen from Queensland
Australian rules footballers from Queensland
Brisbane Lions (AFLW) players